John James Ingalls (December 29, 1833August 16, 1900) was an American Republican politician who served as a United States senator from Kansas. Ingalls is credited with suggesting the state motto and designing the state seal.

Life and career
John James Ingalls was born in Middleton, Massachusetts, on December 29, 1833. He graduated from Williams College in 1855. Foreshadowing his later reputation as a wit, his commencement oration, entitled "Mummy Life," was a satire of college life. He studied law and was admitted to the bar in 1857. Moving to Kansas Territory, Ingalls settled in Atchison in 1860. He joined the anti-slavery forces and worked to make Kansas a free state. He was a member of the Wyandotte constitutional convention in 1859 and is reputed to have coined the state motto, Ad Astra per Aspera.

When Kansas was admitted to the Union in 1861, he became secretary of the first state Senate and state senator in 1862. During the Civil War he served as judge advocate in the Kansas militia. As an editor of the Atchison newspaper, Freedom's Champion, for three years, he won a national reputation for a series of magazine articles. Elected to the U.S. Senate in 1873, succeeding Samuel C. Pomeroy, Ingalls served for 18 years. He supported labor and agriculture against monopolies. He also favored the Interstate Commerce Act and the Pendleton Civil Service Act. Ingalls rejected the nomination of James Campbell Matthews to the recorder of deeds in 1886. Ingalls claimed that his rejection was because of Matthews' non-residency of Washington, D.C.; however, journalists argued that his rejection was racially based.

In 1887 Ingalls was elected President pro tempore of the Senate. Praised throughout his life for his keen sarcasm and quick wit, John James Ingalls died in Las Vegas, New Mexico on August 16, 1900.  He was buried at Mount Vernon Cemetery in Atchison.

In 1905, the state of Kansas donated a marble statue of Ingalls to the U.S. Capitol's National Statuary Hall Collection. After an effort starting in 2011, Kansas replaced Ingalls with Amelia Earhart in 2022.

Personal life
John James Ingalls was a second cousin of Charles Ingalls (father to Little House on the Prairie's Laura Ingalls Wilder).

Notes

External links

 
 
 
 

1833 births
1900 deaths
People from Middleton, Massachusetts
American people of English descent
Republican Party United States senators from Kansas
Presidents pro tempore of the United States Senate
Republican Party Kansas state senators
People from Atchison, Kansas
American abolitionists
19th-century American politicians
Williams College alumni
People of Kansas in the American Civil War